Moon Movies was a 1977 British television series. Hosted by Hughie Green, it asked celebrities which films they would take with them on a long space trip. It was produced by Southern Television. All 13 episodes are believed to be lost.

References

External links
Moon Movies on IMDb

1977 British television series debuts
1977 British television series endings
Lost television shows
English-language television shows
1970s British television series